Three Women, also known as Die Frau, die Freundin und die Dirne, is a 1924 American silent drama film starring May McAvoy, Pauline Frederick, and Marie Prevost, directed by Ernst Lubitsch, and based on the novel Lillis Ehe by Yolande Maree (Iolanthe Mares).

Plot summary
Sleazy bon vivant Edmund Lamont continues to live the high life despite being up to his eyebrows in debt. He begins wooing wealthy socialite Mabel Wilton, conning her into giving him $100,000 to "invest" for her. Meanwhile, her daughter Jeanne unexpectedly arrives from private school, and when Lamont sees her, he promptly begins seeing her surreptitiously. Inevitably both women find out the deception, but the smitten Jeanne agrees to marry him anyway. True to form, Lamont starts seeing Harriet (the third woman of the title), leading to a night club brawl in which he's knocked out with a champagne bottle. He is taken home by Fred, newly-graduated from medical school, who is shocked to learn that Jeanne, his presumptive fiancee, is already married to the man he brought home. Things begin to escalate even more, culminating in a shooting death and a murder trial.

Cast
 May McAvoy as Jeanne Wilton
 Pauline Frederick as Mrs. Mabel Wilton
 Marie Prevost as Harriet
 Lew Cody as Edmund Lamont
 Willard Louis as Harvey Craig
 Pierre Gendron as Fred Armstrong
 Mary Carr as His mother
 Raymond McKee as Fred's friend
 Max Davidson as The Jeweler (uncredited)
 Charles Farrell as College Boy (uncredited)
 George J. Lewis as College Boy (uncredited)
 Tom Ricketts as The Butler (uncredited)
 Rolfe Sedan as Nightclub patron (uncredited)
 Hal Thompson as Minor Role (uncredited)
 Jane Winton as Charity Ball Guest (uncredited)

Box Office
According to Warner Bros records the film earned $344,000 domestically and $94,000 foreign making it the studio's most popular film of 1924-25.

Preservation status
Prints of Three Women are in the collections of the George Eastman House and Filmmuseum München. It was transferred onto 16mm film by Associated Artists Productions in the 1950s and shown on television. A restored version running approximately 70 minutes, with a new orchestral score by Andrew Earle Simpson, has aired on Turner Classic Movies and was released on blu-ray disc in 2022 by Kino Lorber.

References

External links

 
 
 
 Stills and reviews at Pauline Frederick site, stanford.edu

1924 films
1924 drama films
American silent feature films
Silent American drama films
American black-and-white films
Films based on German novels
Films directed by Ernst Lubitsch
1920s American films